Rust is an orange-brown color resembling iron oxide. It is a commonly used color in stage lighting and appears roughly the same color as photographic safelights when used over a standard tungsten light source.

The first recorded use of rust as a color name in English was in 1692.

Origin
Rust is named after the resulting phenomenon of the oxidation of iron.  The word 'rust' finds its etymological origins in the Proto-Germanic word rusta, which translates to "redness."  The word is closely related to the term "ruddy," which also refers to a reddish coloring in an object.

References

See also 
 List of colors

Shades of brown
Shades of orange
Shades of red